This is a list of composers who wrote for lute and similar period instruments: theorbo, chitarrone, vihuela etc. Composers who worked outside of their country of origin are listed according to where they were most active, i.e. German-born Johannes Hieronymus Kapsberger is listed under Italy. Within sections, the order is alphabetical by surname (or, in cases of, for example, Pietrobono and Lorenzino, by first name).

Renaissance and Baroque

Italy

Late 15th century to mid-16th century

 Giovanni Maria Alemanni (fl. 1500–1525, no compositions survive)
 Pietro Paolo Borrono (c. 1490–1563)
 Franciscus Bossinensis (fl. 1510)
 Vincenzo Capirola (1474–after 1548)
 Marco Dall'Aquila (c.1480–after 1538)
 Joan Ambrosio Dalza (fl. 1508)
 Francesco Canova da Milano (1497–1543)
 Francesco Spinacino (fl. 1507)
 Giovanni Angelo Testagrossa (1470–1530, no compositions survive)

Mid 16th–17th centuries
 Bellerofonte Castaldi (1580–1649)
 Francesco Corbetta (c.1615–1681), composer for Baroque guitar
 Fabrizio Dentice (c.1539–1581)
 The Galilei family:
 Vincenzo Galilei (late 1520s–1591)
 Michelagnolo Galilei (1575–1631), his son
 Johannes Hieronymus Kapsberger (c.1580–1651, of German descent)
 Simone Molinaro (c.1570–after 1633)
 Alessandro Piccinini (1566–1638)
 Giovanni Zamboni (fl. second half of the 17th century)

Late 17th–18th centuries
 Francesco Bartolomeo Conti
 Ludovico Roncalli (1654–1713)
 Antonio Vivaldi (1678–1741)

France
 Pierre Attaingnant (c.1494–c.1551, publisher, possibly composer)
 Robert Ballard (1575–1649)
 Julien Belin (c.1525/30–1584)
 Jean-Baptiste Besard (c.1567–after 1616)
 Pierre Blondeau (fl. 1st half of the 16th century)
 Mlle Bocquet (fl. 1st half of the 17th century)
 François de Chancy (1600-1656)
 François Dufaut (before 1604–before 1672)
 Jacques Gallot (died c.1690)
 The Gaultier family:
 Denis Gaultier (1597/1603–1672)
 Ennemond Gaultier (1575–1651), his cousin
 Jacques Gautier (Gaultier) (fl. 1st half of the 17th century, died before 1660)
 Pierre Gautier (Gaultier) (1599–after 1638, active in Italy)
 René Mesangeau (fl. 1567–1638)
 Germain Pinel (c. 1600–1664)
 Guillaume Morlaye (born c.1510)
 Charles Mouton (1617–1699)
 Jean-Paul Paladin (died before September 1565, Italian-born)
 Julien Perrichon (1566–c.1600)
 Jakub Reys (c.1550–c.1605, Polish-born)
 Albert de Rippe (1500–1551, Italian-born)
 Adrian Le Roy (c.1520–1598)
 Robert de Visée (c.1655–1732/3)

Spain
 Esteban Daza (c.1537–1591/6)
 Miguel de Fuenllana (fl. 1553–1578)
 Francisco Guerau (1649–1722, composed for Baroque guitar)
 Luys Milan (c.1500–after 1560)    
 Alonso de Mudarra (c.1510–1580)
 Santiago de Murcia (c.1682–c.1740, moved to Mexico, composed for Baroque guitar)
 Luys de Narváez (fl. 1526–49)
 Diego Pisador (1509/10–after 1557)
 Lucas Ruiz de Ribayaz (born probably before 1650, composed for Baroque guitar)
 Gaspar Sanz (mid-17th century–early 18th century, composed for Baroque guitar)
 Enríquez de Valderrábano (fl. 1547)

England
 Daniel Bacheler (1572–1619)
 Thomas Campion (1567–1620)
 Francis Cutting (c.1550–c.1596)
 John Danyel (1564–c.1626)
 The Dowland family:
 John Dowland (1563–1626)
 Robert Dowland (1591–1641)
 Alfonso Ferrabosco the elder (1543–1588, Italian-born)
 Cuthbert Hely (fl. 1620–1640)
 Anthony Holborne (c.1545–1602)
 The Johnson family:
 John Johnson (c.1545–1594)
 Robert Johnson (c.1580–1634)
 Robert Jones (fl. 1597–1615)
 Thomas Robinson (fl. 1589–1609)
 Philip Rosseter (1567/8–1623)

Netherlands/Belgium
 Emanuel Adriaenssen (c.1554–1604)
 Joachim van den Hove (1567–1620)
 Constantijn Huygens (1596–1687, no compositions survive)
 Philips van Marnix van Sint-Aldegonde (1540–1598, no compositions survive)
 Johannes Matelart (1538-1607)
 Josquin des Prez (c.1450–1521)
 Jacques de Saint-Luc (1616–c.1710, worked in Paris, Vienna, etc.)
 Nicolas Vallet (c.1583–after 1642, French-born)
 Philip van Wilder (c.1500 – 1554)

Germany/Austria

 Johann Sebastian Bach (1685–1750)
 Jacques Bittner (fl. 1680)
 Ernst Gottlieb Baron  (1696–1760)
 Adam Falckenhagen (1697–1754)
 Bernhard Joachim Hagen (1720–1787)
 Hans Gerle (c.1500-1570)
 Hans Judenkünig (c. 1445/50–1526)
 David Kellner (1670–1748)
 Karl Kohaut (1726–1784)
 Johann Kropfgans (1708-1770)
 Wolff Jakob Lauffensteiner (1676–1754)
 Elias Mertel (c.1561-1626)
 Hans Neusidler (c.1508/09–1563)
 Esaias Reusner (17th century)
 Sebastian Anton Scherer (1631–1712, no lute compositions survive)
 Arnolt Schlick (c.1460–after 1521)
 Silvius Leopold Weiss (1686–1750)

Other countries
 Bálint Bakfark (Hungary, c.1526/30–1576)
 Diomedes Cato (Italy, 1560/65–after 1607 or 1618, active in Poland)
 Wojciech Dlugoraj (Poland, 1557/8–c.1619)
 Jan Antonín Losy (Bohemia, c.1643–1721)

20th and 21st centuries
 Dušan Bogdanović (US and Serbia)
 Johann Nepomuk David (Germany)
 Alexandre Danilevsky (France and Russia)
 Vladimir Vavilov (Russia)
 Paulo Galvão (Portugal)
 Jacopo Gianninoto (Italy)
 Sandor Kallos (Ukraine and Russia)
 Ronn McFarlane (US)
 Robert MacKillop (Scotland)
 Toyohiko Satoh (Japan and Netherlands)
 Roman Turovsky-Savchuk (US and Ukraine)
 Jozef van Wissem (US/The Netherlands)
 Andrei Krylov (Canada and Russia)

Lute